The Christmas Truce is a play by Phil Porter based on the true events during the First World War.

Production history 
The play was produced by the Royal Shakespeare Company and premiered in the Royal Shakespeare Theatre in Stratford-upon-Avon for the Christmas 2014 season, 100 years after the events. The play opened on 29 November 2014 (with a press night on 9 December) running until 31 January 2015 and was directed by Erica Whyman.

During the development of the play, the RSC hosted a drop-in event encouraging the relatives of those who fought in the First World War to share stories, photos and letters at the Royal Shakespeare Company in March 2014.

Cast

Royal Shakespeare Company (2014 cast) 

 Joseph Kloska as Capt Bruce Bairnsfather
 Gerard Horan as Old Bill
 Sam Alexander
 Peter Basham
 William Belchambers
 Nick Haverson
 Tunji Kasim
 Sophie Khan Levy
 Oliver Lynes
 Emma Manton
 Chris McCalphy
 Peter McGovern
 Frances McNamee
 Chris Nayak
 Jamie Newall
 Roderick Smith
 Flora Spencer-Longhurst
 Harry Waller
 Thomas Wheatley
 Leah Whitaker

External links 

 Page on the RSC website

References 

2014 plays
British plays
Plays about World War I
Plays based on actual events
Christmas plays